Avlona is a village in Cyprus, about halfway between Nicosia and Morphou. De facto, it is under the control of Northern Cyprus.

References

Communities in Nicosia District
Populated places in Güzelyurt District